John Hamilton (9 December 1946 – 22 September 2007) was an Australian rules footballer who played with Melbourne in the Victorian Football League (VFL).

Notes

External links 

John Hamilton on Demonwiki

1946 births
Australian rules footballers from Tasmania
Melbourne Football Club players
2007 deaths